Destroyer is a  single-player arcade game developed and published by Atari, Inc. in 1977. The player attempts to sink ships and destroy submarines from the perspective of a naval destroyer.

Gameplay 
The playfield displays a ship moving across the surface (displayed as a wavy line) and submarines moving across the screen. The target depth is set using a dial control (displayed as a dashed line). Depth charges are dropped by pushing the dial control. The speed of the ship is controlled using a speed lever control. Charges that miss make a low boom.  Charges that hit make a louder boom and trigger an explosion sequence.  Points are awarded for successful hits.  The game is timed, so the goal is to sink or destroy as many submarines as possible before the time expires.

Development 
Destroyer is a microprocessor-based game, using the Motorola 6800.  The hardware is similar to Drag Race and Firetruck released by Atari and Kee Games within a year.

Legacy
In 1978, coupled with Atari's Canyon Bomber was a game called Sea Bomber which was "basically a port of Destroyer".

References

Arcade video games
1977 video games
Atari games
Naval video games
Video games developed in the United States